Amnon Rapoport (1936-2022) was an Israeli-born quantitative psychologist who was the Eller Professor Emeritus 
of Management and Organizations at the Eller College of Management at the University of Arizona. His research focused on experimental studies of interactive decision-making behavior. He passed away on December 6, 2022 after more than six decades of academic teaching, research, and service.

Biography

Rapoport received his doctoral degree in quantitative psychology from the University of North Carolina, Chapel Hill in 1965. He is a distinguished professor of management and a highly cited scholar in the social sciences. Rapoport has published articles in peer-reviewed journals, including Management Science, Journal of Experimental Psychology: General, American Economic Review, Organizational Behavior and Human Decision Processes, Marketing Science, Psychological Review, and Journal of Personality and Social Psychology. He is best known for studying human decisions in social and interactive contexts with experimental and quantitative methods.

In his current work, Rapoport is interested in experimental studies of interactive decision making behavior, including common pool resource dilemmas, dynamic pricing, fair cost-sharing allocation, route choice in traffic networks, and sequential search by committees.  He has collaborated with David Budescu.

Selected publications

Authored books
Rapoport, A. (1990). Experimental Studies of Interactive Decisions. Dordrecht, Holland: Kluwer Academic Publishers.

Edited books
Rapoport, A., & Zwick, R. (2005). Experimental Business Research Vol. II and III. Springer

Books about Rapoport
Budescu, D. V., Erev, I., & Rami, Z. (1999). Games and Human Behavior: Essays in Honor of Amnon Rapoport. Hillsdale, NJ: Erlbaum.

References

External links
 Profile at the University of Arizona

Year of birth missing (living people)
Living people
University of Arizona faculty

University of North Carolina at Chapel Hill alumni
Israeli psychologists
Israeli expatriates in the United States